Fort McPherson Airport  is located  south of Fort McPherson, Northwest Territories, Canada.

Airlines and destinations

See also
Fort McPherson Water Aerodrome

References

External links
 

Airports in the Arctic
Certified airports in the Inuvik Region